Tunis Augustus Macdonough Craven (January 31, 1893 – May 31, 1972) (known by his initials T.A.M.) was a United States Navy officer in the first half of the 20th century involved in the development of radio and communications.

Early life

Military career
The younger Craven graduated from the United States Naval Academy in 1913. He was a Navy engineer involved in the early history of radio and a close friend of Stanford C. Hooper. In 1917 he was ordered to the Office of Director of Naval Communications, where he oversaw the organization and operation of the Navy's trans-Atlantic radio communications system during the war. In 1927 he served as a technical adviser to the U.S. delegation to Washington international communications conference, and subsequently served as executive officer aboard the oil tanker . He resigned from active duty in 1930, immediately taking a reserve commission. He remained a commander in the reserves until 1944.

Federal Communications Commission
Craven served as Chief Engineer to the Federal Communications Commission between 1935 and 1937 before being appointed to the commission by President Franklin D. Roosevelt in 1937 (serving from 25 August 1937 to 30 June 1944).  A Democrat by party, he was frequently at odds with chairman (and fellow Democrat) James Lawrence Fly.  He declined reappointment at the end of his term in 1944, choosing instead to return to private industry as the vice-president of Iowa Broadcasting Company, owned by the Cowles interests.  After a long delay, FCC general counsel Charles R. Denny was nominated to succeed Craven in March, 1945.  Craven was appointed to an unusual (and so far unique) second appointment by President Dwight D. Eisenhower from 2 July 1956 to 25 March 1963.

References

1893 births
1972 deaths
Date of death missing
United States Navy officers
United States Naval Academy alumni
Members of the Federal Communications Commission
Federal Communications Commission personnel
Franklin D. Roosevelt administration personnel
Eisenhower administration personnel
Kennedy administration personnel